Members of the cabinet of the President Felipe Calderón (2006-2012).

List

Sources 

Cabinet of Mexico
2006 establishments in Mexico
2012 disestablishments in Mexico
Cabinets established in 2006
Cabinets disestablished in 2012